Abdul Khayyum Khan (born 06/12/1956) is an IPS officer and former Commissioner of Police of Hyderabad, India. Khan introduced a rule that drunk drivers will be sent to jail with heavy penalties to curb alcoholism. Khan was the Director General of ACB in the newly formed Telangana State before retiring. He was appointed as Minorities Commission by Government of Telangana in 2015. He currently serves as the Advisor to the Telangana State on minority affairs, a cabinet rank post.

References

1956 births
Indian police officers
Living people
People from Hyderabad, India